Kevin Crohan (21 September 1920 – 3 November 1972) was  a former Australian rules footballer who played with Richmond in the Victorian Football League (VFL).

Notes

External links 		
		
		
		
		
		
		
		
1920 births		
1972 deaths		
Australian rules footballers from Victoria (Australia)		
Richmond Football Club players